Primer amor, a mil por hora (English: First Love, A Thousand per Hour) is a Mexican telenovela produced by Pedro Damián for Televisa in 2000. It is a remake of another Televisa telenovela titled Quinceañera. This teen-oriented soap was one of the highest-rated in its time slot.

On Monday, October 9, 2000, Canal de las Estrellas started broadcasting Primer amor, a mil por hora weekdays at 7:00pm, replacing Locura de amor. The last episode was broadcast on Friday, February 23, 2001 with Amigas y rivales replacing it the following Monday.

Anahí, Kuno Becker, Ana Layevska and Valentino Lanús starred as protagonists, while Mauricio Islas, Arleth Terán, Fabián Robles, and Leticia Perdigón starred as antagonists.

Cast
 
Anahí as Giovanna Luna Guerra
Kuno Becker as León Baldomero
Ana Layevska as Marina Iturriaga Camargo
Valentino Lanús as Imanol Jáuregui Tasso
Mauricio Islas as Demian Ventura
Arleth Terán as Priscila Luna Guerra
Alexa Damián as Emilia Baldomero
Fabián Robles as Santiago García "La Iguana"
Leticia Perdigón as Catalina Guerra de Luna
José Elías Moreno as Esteban Luna
Sebastián Ligarde as Antonio Iturriaga
Mariagna Prats as Pilar Camargo de Iturriaga
Manuel "Flaco" Ibáñez as Conrado Baldomero
Arturo García Tenorio as Indalesio Cano
José María Torre as Bruno Baldomero
Aitor Iturrioz as Boris
Daniela Luján as Sabrina Luna Guerra
Socorro Bonilla as Milagros García
Beatriz Moreno as Benita Morales
Blanca Sánchez as Andrea Camargo
Héctor Gómez as Fernán Camargo
Pilar Pellicer as La Chonta
Alfredo Ahnert as Luis Fernando "Fher"
Damián Mendiola as Vinnie Montijo
Mauricio Aspe as Rodolfo "Rudy"
Rafael Bazán as El Morrito Cano
Enrique Borja Baena as Ricardo "Richard"
Gabriela Cano as Melissa Molina
Roxana Castellanos as Ana Lozano
Ehécatl Chávez as Tirilo
Marcelo Buquet as Sebastián Olivares
Liuba de Lasse as Lourdes "Lulú" Durán
Jackeline del Vecchio as Aura
Kika Edgar as Olivia
Sebastián Rulli as Mauricio
Alan Gutiérrez as Enrique #1
Renato Bartilotti as Enrique #2
Karen Juantorena as Itzel
Adriana Laffan as Dorita
Felipe Nájera as Valente Montijo
Carla Ortiz as Gina
Flavio Peniche as Poncho
Juan José Peña as Comandante Merino
Axel Ricco as Huicho
Eduardo Rivera as Artemio
Karime Saab as Ana's Assistant
Damián Sarka as Diego Ulloa
Pedro Sicard as Claudio
Laisha Wilkins as Tamara
Sergio Sánchez as Ivan
Patricia Martínez as Bernarda
Julio Sánchez as Mariano
Susan Vohn as Bárbara Smith
Alec Von Bargen as Adrián
Arturo Vázquez as Cienfuegos
Dulce María as Brittany
Khotan as José Crescencio Martínez
Lourdes Canale as Susana
Luis Carillo as Dimitri
Arturo Barba as Beto
Alizair Gómez as Julio
Lucero Lander as Inés
Anabel Gutiérrez as Ella
Julio Camejo
Mauricio Barcelata

Soundtrack
 2000: Primer amor... a mil por hora Album.
"Primer amor" by Anahí
"A mil por hora" by Lynda Thomas
"Juntos" by Anahí & Kuno Becker

Awards

References

External links
 Official site on Televisa  

2000 telenovelas
Mexican telenovelas
2000 Mexican television series debuts
2001 Mexican television series endings
Spanish-language telenovelas
Television shows set in Mexico
Televisa telenovelas